The first government of Adolfo Suárez was formed on 8 July 1976, following the latter's appointment as Prime Minister of Spain by King Juan Carlos I on 3 July and his swearing-in on 5 July, as a result of Carlos Arias Navarro's resignation from the post on 1 July 1976.

Suárez's first cabinet comprised members from the National Movement (with the notable absences of FET y de las JONS and the Opus Dei), but also by members of the reformist 'Tácito' group, a number of political associations that could not yet be legalized as parties—such as the Spanish People's Union (UDPE) and the Spanish Democratic Union (UDE)—and the Federation of Independent Studies (FEDISA) political society. Following the death of dictator Francisco Franco, the regulations of the Cortes Españolas had been amended to allow legislators to group into parliamentary factions, one of whom—the Independent Parliamentary Group (GPI), which would later become the Independent Social Federation (FSI) party—being represented in the Council of Ministers through Rodolfo Martín Villa.

On 7 April 1977, the National Movement and the FET y de las JONS party were officially disbanded, and many cabinet members—who had gone their own separate ways to a number of political parties ahead of the 1977 general election—joined into the nascent Union of the Democratic Centre (UCD) electoral alliance under Suárez's leadership upon its formation in May 1977.

Cabinet changes
Suárez's first government saw a number of cabinet changes during its tenure:
On 23 September 1976, Fernando de Santiago was replaced as First Deputy Prime Minister by Manuel Gutiérrez Mellado.
Minister of the Navy Gabriel Pita da Veiga announced his resignation on 12 April 1977 over personal disagreements with the government's decision to legalize the Communist Party of Spain (PCE) on 9 April; he was replaced by Admiral Pascual Pery on 15 April.
On 23 April 1977, Leopoldo Calvo-Sotelo resigned as Minister of Public Works in order to organize the newly-formed Union of the Democratic Centre (UCD) ahead of the 1977 Spanish general election. Carlos Pérez de Bricio took on the ordinary duties of the affairs of the ministry until Calvo-Sotelo's successor, Luis Ortiz González, could take office on 11 May 1977.

Council of Ministers
The Council of Ministers was structured into the offices for the prime minister, the two deputy prime ministers and 19 ministries, including one minister without portfolio.

Notes

References

Bibliography

External links
Governments. Juan Carlos I (20.11.1975 ...). CCHS-CSIC (in Spanish).
Governments of Spain 1975–1977. Ministers of Carlos Arias Navarro and Adolfo Suárez. Historia Electoral.com (in Spanish).
The governments of the Transition (1975–1977). Lluís Belenes i Rodríguez History Page (in Spanish).
Biographies. Royal Academy of History (in Spanish).

1976 establishments in Spain
1977 disestablishments in Spain
Cabinets established in 1976
Cabinets disestablished in 1977
Council of Ministers (Spain)